The Quad City Storm is a professional minor league hockey team to begin play in the 2018–19 season as a member of the Southern Professional Hockey League. The team is based in the Quad Cities area of Illinois and Iowa, with home games at the Vibrant Arena at The MARK in Moline, Illinois. The team replaced the ECHL's Quad City Mallards after the ownership ceased operations of the team in 2018. Due to the effects of the COVID-19 pandemic, the Storm was one of several SPHL teams to not participate in the 2020–21 season.

History

In 2018, the Quad City Mallards' owner Jordan Melville stated he was folding the team after losing about US$4 million since he became the sole owner in 2013. On May 24, 2018, local ownership consisting of Ryan Mosley and John Dawson obtained a franchise in the Southern Professional Hockey League to replace the Mallards at the TaxSlayer Center for the 2018–19 season by purchasing the franchise rights of the defunct Louisiana IceGators. Former original Mallards' owner Howard Cornfield was brought on as a consultant. The team hired longtime SPHL player Dave Pszenyczny as their inaugural head coach. As the Mallards name was unavailable due to the ECHL retaining the trademark, the new team held a name-the-team contest with new name announced as the Quad City Storm on June 21.

Records

2018–19 
The Storm finished their inaugural season in ninth place out of ten teams, missing the 2019 President's Cup playoffs. The team had a final record of 18–33–5, scoring an average of 2.55 goals per game and allowing an average of 3.45 goals against per game.

2019–20 
The sophomore season for the Storm, the team fared slightly better with a final record of 16–20–8. The team was in seventh place out of the ten teams due to points percentage, but was tied for last in the league in total points, before the COVID-19 pandemic curtailed the 2019–20 season on March 15, 2020.

References

External links
Official Storm website

Professional ice hockey teams in Illinois
Southern Professional Hockey League teams
Ice hockey clubs established in 2018
2018 establishments in Illinois
Moline, Illinois